The IET Mountbatten Medal is awarded annually for an outstanding contribution, or contributions over a period, to the promotion of electronics or information technology and their application. The Medal was established by the National Electronics Council in 1992 and named after Louis Mountbatten, The Earl Mountbatten of Burma, Admiral of the Fleet and Governor-General of India. Since 2011, the medal has been awarded as one of the IET Achievement Medals.

Eligibility 
One of the IET's Prestige Achievement Medals, the Medal is awarded to an individual for an outstanding contribution, or contributions
over a period, to the promotion of electronics or information technology and in the dissemination of the understanding of electronics and information technology to young people, or adults.

Criteria 
In selecting a winner, the Panel give particular emphasis to:
 the stimulation of public awareness of the significance and value of electronics;
 spreading recognition of the economic significance of electronics and IT, and encouraging their effective use throughout industry in general;
 encouraging excellence in product innovation and the successful transition of scientific advances to wealth-creating products;
 recognising brilliance in academic and industrial research;
 encouraging young people of both sexes to make their careers in the electronics and IT industries;
 increasing the awareness of the importance of electronics and IT amongst teachers and others in the educational disciplines.

Recipients

See also 

 List of computer science awards
 List of computer-related awards
 List of engineering awards
 List of awards named after people

References

External links 
 

Awards established in 1992
British science and technology awards
Computer science awards
Engineering awards
Institution of Engineering and Technology